Lukas Bärfuss (born 30 December 1971) is a Swiss writer and playwright who writes in German. He won the Georg Büchner Prize in 2019.

Biography
Born in Thun, Switzerland in 1971, Lukas Bärfuss began training as a bookseller after graduating from high school. In 1998, he co-founded the independent theater group 400asa.

Awards
Bärfuss has won the Mülheimer Dramatikerpreis in 2005 for the play Der Bus (Das Zeug einer Heiligen), the Anna Seghers-Preis in 2008, the Hans Fallada Prize in 2010, the Solothurner Literaturpreis in 2014, the Swiss Book Prize in 2014 for Koala, the Nicolas Born Prize in 2015 and the Johann-Peter-Hebel-Preis in 2016.

In 2019, he was awarded the Georg Büchner Prize for his dramas, novels and essays. The Deutsche Akademie für Sprache und Dichtung praised his work, among other things, as being permeated by "a high degree of stylistic certainty and formal richness of variation" that explores "always anew and differently fundamental existential situations of modern life." The prize was awarded in Darmstadt on November 2, 2019. The Georg Büchner Prize is regarded as the most prestigious prize in German literature. Bärfuss was the fourth Swiss to win the Prize and the first Swiss winner in 25 years, the last Swiss winner being Adolf Muschg in 1994.

Memberships
Bärfuss has been a member of the Deutsche Akademie für Sprache und Dichtung since early summer 2015.

Works

Plays

 Sophokles' Ödipus (1998)
 Siebzehn Uhr Siebzehn (2000)
 74 Sekunden (2000)
 Vier Frauen (2000)
 Die Reise von Klaus und Edith durch den Schacht zum Mittelpunkt der Erde (2001)
 Meienbergs Tod (2001)
 Vier Bilder der Liebe (2002)
 Die sexuellen Neurosen unserer Eltern (2003)
 Der Bus (Das Zeug einer Heiligen) (2005)
 Alices Reise in die Schweiz (2005)
 Die Probe (Der brave Simon Korach) (2007)
 Amygdala (2009)
 Öl (2009)
 Malaga (2010)
 Zwanzigtausend Seiten (2012)
 Die schwarze Halle (2013)
 Frau Schmitz (2016)
 Der Elefantengeist (2018)
  Julien – Rot und Schwarz (2020)

Books

References

External links
 

1971 births
Living people
Swiss writers
Canton of Bern
People from Thun
Georg Büchner Prize winners
Swiss male novelists
21st-century Swiss novelists
Swiss dramatists and playwrights
Swiss Book Prize winners
Members of the German Academy for Language and Literature